Prince Wilhelm Albert Raphael Maria of Urach, Count of Württemberg, 5th Duke of Urach (born on 9 August 1957), is the head of the morganatic Urach branch of the dynasty which reigned as kings of Württemberg in Germany until 1918. He was also the fourth successor to the defunct and short-lived Lithuanian throne until his morganatic marriage, following which the Lithuanian royal pretension was passed on to his youngest brother, Prince Inigo.

Life
Prince Wilhelm Albert was born at Hohenberg Castle near Seeshaupt, Bavaria, the son of Prince Eberhard of Urach and Princess Iniga of Thurn and Taxis. He is the grandson and heir of Wilhelm, 2nd Duke of Urach, who was offered the throne of Lithuania in anticipation of its conversion to an independent post-World War I kingdom, but he declined the crown in November 1919, as the prospect of a Baltic monarchy lost momentum. In October 1924 Duke Wilhelm also renounced his claim to the throne of Monaco. The Urachs' ducal and princely titles ceased being insignia of rank when the German Empire fell and the republican regime which succeeded it decreed in 1919 that hereditary titles would henceforth simply be treated as surnames, carrying no legal privileges. Urach had, in fact, been a dukedom in name only, to which no territorial duchy had been attached.

Prince Wilhelm Albert succeeded his brother Karl Anselm as titular Duke of Urach when the latter renounced the headship of the family at Niederaichbach on 9 February 1991, upon the occasion of his marriage to a commoner.

He is described as an engineer who lives at Ossenberg Castle near Düsseldorf. He and his family also remain in possession of the House of Urach's historical family seat, Lichtenstein Castle, south of Stuttgart, which is open to the public.

Marriage and issue
Prince Wilhelm Albert's marriage with Karen von Brauchitsch-Berghe von Trips (who was born in Rimburg Castle on 24 September 1959 to Konrad von Brauchitsch, member of a noble family of Limburg known since the 12th century, and wife Mariette Hermans, and who had been adopted in 1988 by her first cousin twice removed Count Clemens Berghe von Trips, inheriting Ossenberg Castle) was celebrated religiously at Rimburg in Limburg on 1 February 1992, the couple having been wed civilly on 23 December 1991 at Rheinberg in Wessel. They have one son and two daughters: 
 Prince Karl Philipp Amedee Konrad Maria of Urach (b. 6 July 1990)
 Princess Alexandra-Charlotte of Urach (b. 18 February 1992)
 Princess Louisa Antonia Gabriele Elisabeth of Urach (b. 12 February 1994)

The marriage produced a minor dispute as to whether it, like that of his elder brother, was also morganatic. This due to the fact that Karen von Brauchitsch-Berghe von Trips did not meet . As such, the next in line would be his younger brother Inigo who married Baroness Daniela von und zu Bodman. Wilhelm Albert remained unconvinced

Ancestry

Notes

References
The Peerage website

1957 births
Living people
Dukes of Urach
German Roman Catholics
Lithuanian people of German descent
People from Bad Tölz-Wolfratshausen
Princes of Urach